Felix Haug (March 27, 1952 – May 1, 2004) was the drummer and keyboardist for the Swiss band Double from the time of its creation in 1981 to its disbandment in 1987. He died of a heart attack in 2004. Haug had three children with his wife, Vera.

References

External links

1952 births
2004 deaths
Swiss drummers
Swiss male musicians
Male drummers
Swiss keyboardists
20th-century male musicians